Ethnic cleansing is the systematic forced removal of ethnic, racial, and religious groups from a given area, with the intent of making a region ethnically homogeneous. Along with direct removal, extermination, deportation or population transfer, it also includes indirect methods aimed at forced migration by coercing the victim group to flee and preventing its return, such as murder, rape, and property destruction.  It constitutes a crime against humanity and may also fall under the Genocide Convention, even as ethnic cleansing has no legal definition under international criminal law.

Many instances of ethnic cleansing have occurred throughout history; the term was first used by the perpetrators as a euphemism during the Yugoslav Wars in the 1990s. Since then, the term has gained widespread acceptance due to journalism and the media's heightened use of the term in its generic meaning.

Etymology 

An antecedent to the term is the Greek word  (lit. "enslavement"), which was used in ancient texts. e.g., to describe atrocities that accompanied Alexander the Great's conquest of Thebes in 335 BC. In the early 1900s, regional variants of the term could be found among the Czechs, the Poles, the French and the Germans. A 1913 Carnegie Endowment report condemning the actions of all participants in the Balkan Wars contained various new terms to describe brutalities committed toward ethnic groups.

During World War II, the euphemism  ("cleansing the terrain") was used by the Croatian Ustaše to describe military actions in which non-Croats were purposely killed or otherwise uprooted from their homes. Viktor Gutić, a senior Ustaše leader, was one of the first Croatian nationalists on record to use the term as a euphemism for committing atrocities against Serbs. The term was later used in the internal memorandums of Serbian Chetniks in reference to a number of retaliatory massacres they committed against Bosniaks and Croats between 1941 and 1945. The Russian phrase  (lit. "cleansing of borders") was used in Soviet documents of the early 1930s to refer to the forced resettlement of Polish people from the  border zone in the Byelorussian and Ukrainian SSRs. This process of the population transfer in the Soviet Union was repeated on an even larger scale in 1939–1941, involving many other groups suspected of disloyalty. During the Holocaust, Nazi Germany pursued a policy of ensuring that Europe was "cleaned of Jews".  The Nazi  called for the genocide and ethnic cleansing of most Slavic people in central and eastern Europe for the purpose of providing more living space for the Germans.

In its complete form, the term appeared for the first time in the Romanian language in an address by Vice Prime Minister Mihai Antonescu to cabinet members in July 1941. After the beginning of the invasion by the Soviet Union, he concluded: "I do not know when the Romanians will have such chance for ethnic cleansing." In the 1980s, the Soviets used the term "ethnic cleansing" to describe the inter-ethnic violence in Nagorno-Karabakh. At around the same time, the Yugoslav media used it to describe what they alleged was an Albanian nationalist plot to force all Serbs to leave Kosovo. It was widely popularized by the Western media during the Bosnian War (1992–1995).

In 1992, the German equivalent of ethnic cleansing was named German Un-word of the Year by the Gesellschaft für deutsche Sprache due to its euphemistic, inappropriate nature.

Definitions 
The Final Report of the Commission of Experts established pursuant to Security Council Resolution 780 defined ethnic cleansing as "a purposeful policy designed by one ethnic or religious group to remove by violent and terror-inspiring means the civilian population of another ethnic or religious group from certain geographic areas". In its previous, first interim report it noted, "based on the many reports describing the policy and practices conducted in the former Yugoslavia, [that] 'ethnic cleansing' has been carried out by means of murder, torture, arbitrary arrest and detention, extra-judicial executions, rape and sexual assaults, confinement of civilian population in ghetto areas, forcible removal, displacement and deportation of civilian population, deliberate military attacks or threats of attacks on civilians and civilian areas, and wanton destruction of property. Those practices constitute crimes against humanity and can be assimilated to specific war crimes. Furthermore, such acts could also fall within the meaning of the Genocide Convention."

The official United Nations definition of ethnic cleansing is "rendering an area ethnically homogeneous by using force or intimidation to remove from a given area persons of another ethnic or religious group." As a category, ethnic cleansing encompasses a continuum or spectrum of policies. In the words of Andrew Bell-Fialkoff, "ethnic cleansing ... defies easy definition. At one end it is virtually indistinguishable from forced emigration and population exchange while at the other it merges with deportation and genocide. At the most general level, however, ethnic cleansing can be understood as the expulsion of a population from a given territory."

Terry Martin has defined ethnic cleansing as "the forcible removal of an ethnically defined population from a given territory" and as "occupying the central part of a continuum between genocide on one end and nonviolent pressured ethnic emigration on the other end."

Gregory Stanton, the founder of Genocide Watch, has criticised the rise of the term and its use for events that he feels should be called "genocide": because "ethnic cleansing" has no legal definition, its media use can detract attention from events that should be prosecuted as genocide.

As a crime under international law 
There is no international treaty that specifies a specific crime of ethnic cleansing; however, ethnic cleansing in the broad sense—the forcible deportation of a population—is defined as a crime against humanity under the statutes of both the International Criminal Court (ICC) and the International Criminal Tribunal for the Former Yugoslavia (ICTY). The gross human rights violations integral to stricter definitions of ethnic cleansing are treated as separate crimes falling under public international law of crimes against humanity and in certain circumstances genocide. There are also situations, such as the expulsion of Germans after World War II, where ethnic cleansing has taken place without legal redress (see Preussische Treuhand v. Poland). Timothy v. Waters argues that similar ethnic cleansing could go unpunished in the future.

Causes 

According to Michael Mann, in The Dark Side of Democracy (2004), murderous ethnic cleansing is strongly related to the creation of democracies. He argues that murderous ethnic cleansing is due to the rise of nationalism, which associates citizenship with a specific ethnic group. Democracy, therefore, is tied to ethnic and national forms of exclusion. Nevertheless, it is not democratic states that are more prone to commit ethnic cleansing, because minorities tend to have constitutional guarantees. Neither are stable authoritarian regimes (except the nazi and communist regimes) which are likely perpetrators of murderous ethnic cleansing, but those regimes that are in process of democratization. Ethnic hostility appears where ethnicity overshadows social classes as the primordial system of social stratification. Usually, in deeply divided societies, categories such as class and ethnicity are deeply intertwined, and when an ethnic group is seen as oppressor or exploitative of the other, serious ethnic conflict can develop. Michael Mann holds that when two ethnic groups claim sovereignty over the same territory and can feel threatened, their differences can lead to severe grievances and danger of ethnic cleansing. The perpetration of murderous ethnic cleansing tends to occur in unstable geopolitical environments and in contexts of war. As ethnic cleansing requires high levels of organisation and is usually directed by states or other authoritative powers, perpetrators are usually state powers or institutions with some coherence and capacity, not failed states as it is generally perceived. The perpetrator powers tend to get support by core constituencies that favour combinations of nationalism, statism and violence.

Genocide 

Ethnic cleansing has been described as part of a continuum of violence whose most extreme form is genocide, where the perpetrator's goal is the destruction of the targeted group.  Ethnic cleansing is similar to forced deportation or population transfer whereas genocide is the attempt to destroy part or all of a particular ethnic, racial, religious, or national group. While ethnic cleansing and genocide may share the same goal and the acts which are used to perpetrate both crimes may often resemble each other, ethnic cleansing is intended to displace a persecuted population from a given territory, while genocide is intended to destroy a group.

Some academics consider genocide to be a subset of "murderous ethnic cleansing". As Norman Naimark writes, these concepts are different but related, for "literally and figuratively, ethnic cleansing bleeds into genocide, as mass murder is committed in order to rid the land of a people". William Schabas adds, "Ethnic cleansing is also a warning sign of genocide to come. Genocide is the last resort of the frustrated ethnic cleanser." Sociologist Martin Shaw has criticized distinguishing between ethnic cleansing and genocide as he believes that both ultimately result in the destruction of a group though coercive violence.

As a military, political, and economic tactic 

The foibe massacres, or simply "the foibe", refers to mass killings both during and after World War II, mainly committed by Yugoslav Partisans and OZNA in the then-Italian territories of Julian March (Karst Region and Istria), Kvarner and Dalmatia also against the local ethnic Italian population (Istrian Italians and Dalmatian Italians). The type of attack was state terrorism and ethnic cleansing against Italians. The foibe massacres were followed by the Istrian–Dalmatian exodus, which was the post-World War II exodus and departure of between 230,000 and 350,000 of local ethnic Italians (Istrian Italians and Dalmatian Italians) towards Italy, and in smaller numbers, towards the Americas, Australia and South Africa. From 1947, after the war, they were subject by Yugoslav authorities to less violent forms of intimidation, such as nationalization, expropriation, and discriminatory taxation, which gave them little option other than emigration. In 1953, there were 36,000 declared Italians in Yugoslavia, just about 16% of the original Italian population before World War II. According to the census organized in Croatia in 2001 and that organized in Slovenia in 2002, the Italians who remained in the former Yugoslavia amounted to 21,894 people (2,258 in Slovenia and 19,636 in Croatia).

When enforced as part of a political settlement, as happened with the expulsion of Germans after World War II through the forced resettlement of ethnic Germans to Germany in its reduced borders after 1945, the forced population movements, constituting a type of ethnic cleansing, may contribute to long-term stability of a post-conflict nation. Some justifications may be made as to why the targeted group will be moved in the conflict resolution stages, as in the case of the ethnic Germans, some individuals of the large German population in Czechoslovakia and prewar Poland had encouraged Nazi jingoism before World War II, but this was forcibly resolved.

Instances 

In many cases, the side perpetrating the alleged ethnic cleansing and its allies have fiercely disputed the charge. Ethnic cleansing is usually accompanied by efforts to remove physical and cultural evidence of the targeted group in the territory through the destruction of homes, social centers, farms, and infrastructure, as well as through the desecration of monuments, cemeteries, and places of worship.

Mutual ethnic cleansing 
Mutual ethnic cleansing occurs when two groups commit ethnic cleansing against minority members of the other group within their own territories. For instance in the 1920s, Turkey expelled its Greek minority and Greece expelled its Turkish minority following the Greco-Turkish War. Other examples of mutual ethnic cleansings include the Nagorno-Karabakh conflict and the demographic transfers of Germans, Poles and Ukrainians after World War II.

See also 

Population cleansing
 Classicide
 Communal violence
 Democide
 Ethnic violence
 Ethnocide
 Forced displacement
Genocide
 Genocidal massacre
 Identity cleansing
 Linguicide
 List of wars and anthropogenic disasters by death toll
 Monoethnicity
 Politicide
 Population transfer
 Religious cleansing
 Social cleansing

Explanatory notes

Notes

References 

 
 
 
 Vladimir Petrović (2007), Etnicizacija čišćenja u reči i nedelu (Ethnicisation of Cleansing), Hereticus 1/2007, 11–36

Further reading 

 de Zayas, Alfred M.: Nemesis at Potsdam, Routledge, London 1977.
 de Zayas, Alfred M.: A Terrible Revenge. Palgrave/Macmillan, New York, 1994. .

 de Zayas, Alfred M.: Heimatrecht ist Menschenrecht. Universitas, München 2001. .

 de Zayas, Alfred M.: "Forced Population Transfer" in Max Planck Encyclopedia of Public International Law, Oxford online 2010.
 
 Douglas, R. M.: Orderly and Humane: The Expulsion of the Germans after the Second World War. Yale University Press, 2012 .
 Kamusella, Tomasz. 2018. Ethnic Cleansing During the Cold War: The Forgotten 1989 Expulsion of Turks from Communist Bulgaria (Ser: Routledge Studies in Modern European History). London: Routledge, 328pp. .
 Prauser, Steffen and Rees, Arfon: The Expulsion of the "German" Communities from Eastern Europe at the End of the Second Century. Florence, Italy, European University Institute, 2004.

External links 

 Genocide of The Ethnic Germans in Yugoslavia 1944–1948
 Photojournalist's Account – Images of ethnic cleansing in Sudan
 Timothy V. Waters, On the Legal Construction of Ethnic Cleansing, Paper 951, 2006, University of Mississippi School of Law (PDF)
 Dump the "ethnic cleansing" jargon, group implores May 31, 2007, World Science
 

 
Collective punishment
Ethnic conflict
Euphemisms
Forced migration
Human rights abuses
Persecution
Racism
Violence
1940s neologisms